Henri-Edgar Lavigueur (16 February 1867 – 29 October 1943) was a Liberal party member of the House of Commons of Canada and served as alderman and Mayor of Quebec City where he was born. His grandmother, Marguerite, was the daughter of  General Sir Howard Douglas, 3rd Bt, Governor of New Brunswick.

Lavigueur was a merchant by career, a co-founder of the Lavigueur and Hutchison company which sold sewing machines and musical instruments.

In 1906, Lavigueur was elected an alderman for the Saint-Jean-Baptiste ward, in Quebec City. In 1916, he became the city's Mayor and remained in that position until 1920.

Lavigueur entered national politics in 1917 federal election with his election to Parliament at the Quebec County riding as a Laurier Liberal. He was re-elected there in the 1921 election with his party membership becoming the traditional Liberal party designation. In the 1925, 1926 and 1930 elections, he was re-elected at the Québec—Montmorency riding.

Having left federal politics at the end of his term in the 16th Canadian Parliament, Lavigueur already returned for further terms as Quebec City's mayor. He remained mayor until 1934, during which he chaired the centennial of the city's 1833 constitution.

Electoral record

External links
 
  City of Quebec: Lavigueur, escalier, rue
  University of Sherbrooke, Bilan du Siècle:  Henri-Edgar Lavigueur (1867-1943) Homme politique, homme d'affaires

1867 births
1943 deaths
Members of the House of Commons of Canada from Quebec
Liberal Party of Canada MPs
Mayors of Quebec City